New Saint Andrews College is a private classical Christian college in Moscow, Idaho. It was founded in 1994 by Christ Church, and modeled in part on the curriculum of Harvard College of the seventeenth century.  The college offers no undergraduate majors, but follows a single, integrated classical liberal arts curriculum from a Christian worldview in its associate's and bachelor's degree programs. The college also offers master's degrees in theology and letters and classical Christian studies. The New Saint Andrews board, faculty, and staff are confessionally Reformed (Calvinist). Board members are affiliated with the Communion of Reformed Evangelical Churches (CREC).

History
New Saint Andrews began with four students in the fall of 1994 and graduated its first two students in 1998. It moved to its present location in downtown Moscow when it purchased the historic Skattaboe Block (1892).

In 2005, New Saint Andrews became an accredited member of the Transnational Association of Christian Colleges and Schools (TRACS), which is recognized by the U.S. Department of Education and the Council for Higher Education Accreditation (CHEA). TRACS authorized the college as a Category III Master's degree-granting institution in April 2007. New Saint Andrews was nationally reaccredited in 2010. The college is a charter member of the Association of Classical and Christian Schools (ACCS) and a member of the Association of Reformed Institutions of Higher Education (ARIHE).

The college was featured on the Christian Broadcasting Network in March 2006. In August 2006 New Saint Andrews was named by the Intercollegiate Studies Institute as one of the top 50 schools for "conservatives, old-fashioned liberals, and people of faith."  The college was also featured in the September 30, 2007 edition of The New York Times Magazine in an article titled, "Onward Christian Scholars."

Roy Atwood served as president until 2014, and was succeeded by Ben Merkle.

Academics and student life
The college's classical Christian program of studies follows the Trivium and Quadrivium in its single, integrated undergraduate curriculum in liberal arts and culture. The curriculum stresses learning from great books and developing the skills to be a lifelong learner.  Rather than using textbooks, the college requires reading of primary works in the classical and Christian literature of Western civilization. The college uses "Oxford-style" small group recitations, in which six to eight students meet with individual faculty members to discuss the assigned readings. Students have examinations every eight weeks, many of which are conducted orally. Seniors are required to write theses and defend them before a faculty panel. The college offers associate and bachelor's degrees in liberal arts and culture, a Master of Arts in Trinitarian theology and culture, and a Master of Studies (and Graduate Certificate) in Classical Christian Studies.

The college limits new student enrollment to about 50–60 new undergraduates and 10–15 graduate students each year. The student body numbers about 160 students (150 full-time equivalent) from about 30 states, five foreign countries, and more than 20 Christian denominations. Approximately half of the college's students were home-schooled and a quarter attended Association of Classical and Christian Schools (ACCS) affiliated high schools.

The college provides no dormitories or food services, by board policy. Instead, it encourages students to live as responsible members of the local community, and assists students and their families in arranging appropriate housing.

As of the May 2010 Commencement, the college had more than 200 alumni. Approximately one-third of the college's graduates pursue graduate school or advanced professional studies, one-third go on to teach at classical and Christian schools, and one-third pursue other callings or professions.

Sports
New Saint Andrews College does not participate in the National Collegiate Athletic Association (NCAA), but does offer a variety of intramural sports, namely men's rugby, women's volleyball, and co-ed soccer.

Notable faculty
Douglas Wilson
N. D. Wilson

Further reading
 Molly Worthen (2007). "Onward Christian Scholars", The New York Times Magazine, September 30, 2007.
 John Zmirak (2006). All-American Colleges: Top Schools for Conservatives, Old-Fashioned Liberals and People of Faith. Wilmington, Delaware: Intercollegiate Studies Institute, 2006.
 Samuel Schuman (2010). Seeing the Light: Religious Colleges in Twenty-First-Century America. Baltimore, Maryland: Johns Hopkins University Press, 2010.

References

External links
 

Christian universities and colleges in the United States
Transnational Association of Christian Colleges and Schools
Educational institutions established in 1994
Classical Christian schools
Seminaries and theological colleges in Idaho
Reformed universities and colleges
Buildings and structures in Latah County, Idaho
Education in Latah County, Idaho
Moscow, Idaho
1994 establishments in Idaho